Bulimulus blombergi is a species of  tropical air-breathing land snail in the subfamily Bulimulinae.

This species is endemic to Ecuador.

References

Bulimulus
Endemic gastropods of the Galápagos Islands
Taxonomy articles created by Polbot